Rhinolekos capetinga is a species of catfish in the family Loricariidae. It is native to South America, where it occurs in the Tocantins River basin in Brazil. It is typically found in shallow, flat areas with clear water, a depth of around 1 m (3 ft), and moderate to fast water flow, where it is often seen in association with vegetation. The species reaches 3.9 cm (1.5 inches) in standard length. Its specific name, capetinga, is derived from a Tupi–Guarani language and reportedly refers to a historical name for São João D'Aliança.

References 

Loricariidae
Fish described in 2015
Catfish of South America
Fish of Brazil